Shrenu Parikh (born 11 November 1989) is an Indian television actress. She is best known for portraying Aastha Agnihotri in the StarPlus romantic drama Iss Pyaar Ko Kya Naam Doon? Ek Baar Phir (2013–2015) and Gauri Kumari Sharma in the drama series Ishqbaaaz (2017–2018).

Early life and education
Parikh was born and brought up in Vadodara, Gujarat. She completed her education in Vadodara with a [ Pharmacy] degree from the Babaria Institute of Pharmacy. She has a younger brother, Shubham Parikh.

Career
Parikh's first television appearance was a cameo role in the show Zindgi Ka Har Rang...Gulaal in 2010.

Parikh secured her first television lead role in the Colors TV show Havan in 2011. She then did lead role in Byaah Hamari Bahoo Ka opposite Gaurav Khanna which aired on Sony TV. Speaking about her experience in this series, she says “I learned voice modulation and working on body language. I have grown as an actor”.

Parikh appeared in the StarPlus's romantic drama Iss Pyaar Ko Kya Naam Doon? Ek Baar Phir (2013–2015) and was paired opposite Avinash Sachdev, in which she portrayed Aastha Agnihotri, a strong progressive woman who aims to drive toward change by fighting against domestic violence to give recognition to women in her family. Speaking about her experience in this show, Parikh stated that it was her turning point in her career since she was offered future roles because of her recognition as Aastha.

In 2017, Parikh appeared in the first Indian television spin-off series on StarPlus, Dil Boley Oberoi in 2017, portraying Gauri Kumari Sharma opposite Kunal Jaisingh. This series was later merged with StarPlus's Ishqbaaaz in which Parikh continued her portrayal of Gauri in the drama series Ishqbaaaz (2017–2018). Parikh quit the show in 2018 after the series took a generation leap.

In 2017, Parikh made her film debut in Thodi Thodi Si Manmaaniyan opposite Arsh Sehrawat. In 2018, she appeared in her second film, Lamboo Rastoo opposite Jay Soni.

In 2019, Parikh played her first anti-heroine role in the StarPlus's thriller series Ek Bhram...Sarvagun Sampanna opposite Zain Imam, in which she played Janhvi Mittal, a woman fueled by revenge to destroy the Mittal family.

Parikh appeared in her first web series, a Gujarati political thriller, Kshadyantra (2021) playing Shalini Patel, a woman who is after materialistic greed, with an ambition to escalate her political power. Parikh then appeared in a Hindi psychological crime drama web series, Damaged 3 (2021) portraying Shanaya Roy, who is a stubborn and secretive journalist. In 2021, Parikh portrayed Genda in the &TV social drama series, Ghar Ek Mandir – Kripa Agrasen Maharaj Ki alongside Akshay Mhatre. The show was entirely filmed in Jaipur, Rajasthan.

Since February 2023, Parikh is portraying Maitree in the Zee Tv's series Maitree.

Filmography

Television

Special appearances

Films

Web series

Music videos

References

External links

Shrenu Parikh at YouTube

Living people
Indian television actresses
Female models from Mumbai
Actresses from Mumbai
People from Vadodara
Gujarati people
1989 births